Krau may refer to:

 Carolyn Krau (born 1943), British figure skater
 Krau Wildlife Reserve, Malaysia

See also
 Crau
 Kraus